is a Japanese freelance journalist, a former senior researcher of Mainichi Shimbun Newspaper, and a professor emeritus at the University of Shizuoka.

Biography
Born and raised in Okayama prefecture, during his childhood he spent many hours at a secondhand bookstore near his home. The experience of reading the many books there whet his appetite for learning and influenced his decision to become a journalist educator and writer.
He attended Keio University and majored in economics and, upon graduating, worked for Kure Mainichi Shinbun (Newspaper) in 1973. 
In July 1981, he was promoted to senior researcher at Mainichi Shimbun (Newspaper) headquarters. In April 1993, he became a professor at University of Shizuoka and taught journalism, media and international communications.
He retired in 2009 and is currently a freelance journalist and enjoys sea canoeing and fishing.

Books
 Nippon Shikei Hakusyo (日本死刑白書, Japanese Death Penalty White Paper): 1982
 Ennzai To Gohan (冤罪と誤判, A criminal accusation and Wrong Judgement): 1982
 Ayamatta Shikei (誤った死刑, the wrong death penalty): 1984
 Shinbun Kisya (新聞記者, News Paper Reporter): 1984
 Nihon Hanzai Zukan (日本犯罪図鑑, Japanese Crimes): 1985
 Kijin Henjin Futujin(奇人・変人・フツー人): 1986
 Hei Ha Kyouki nari, Sensou to Shinbun『兵は凶器なり・戦争と新聞』(Solder is a Weapon / War and News Paper): 1986
 Syouwa Cyoujin Kijin Katarogu(昭和超人奇人カタログ): 1990
 Sakusesu Meigen Meikunsyu (サクセス名言明訓集): 1990
 Shikei(死刑, Death Penalty): 1991
 Genron Shi Shite Kuni Tuini Horobu, Sensou to Shinbun(言論死して国ついに亡ぶ・戦争と新聞): 1993
 Bijinesu Meigen Kai(ビジネス名言海): 1994
 Media No Sensou Sekinin(メディアの戦争責任: 1995
 Nippon Kijin Den(ニッポン奇人伝): 1996
 Media Kontororu, Nihon No Sensou Houdo(メディアコントロールー日本の戦争報道, Media Control – Japanese War Report): 2005
 Nippon Ijin Kikou Roku (ニッポン偉人奇行録): 2006　
 "Syasetu" Senryou To Tandokukouwa(「写説」占領と単独講和):2006
 Taiheiyou Sensou To Shinbun (太平洋戦争と新聞, The Pacific War and News Paper): 2007
 Hyakujusya Hyakugo(百寿者百語): 2008

References
 "Media connivance in walking the dogs of war" by The Japan Times Online

External links
 Official website
 Official blog

Japanese journalists
Academic staff of the University of Shizuoka
1943 births
Keio University alumni
Living people
People from Okayama
Japanese non-fiction writers